William Devane (25 November 1871 – 4 May 1940) was an Irish sportsperson. He played hurling with his local club Tubberadora and was a member of the Tipperary senior hurling team between 1895 and 1898.

Honours

Tipperary
All-Ireland Senior Hurling Championship (3): 1895, 1896, 1898
Munster Senior Hurling Championship (3): 1895, 1896, 1898

References

1871 births
1940 deaths
Tubberadora hurlers
Tipperary inter-county hurlers
All-Ireland Senior Hurling Championship winners